David Francis Williamson, Baron Williamson of Horton  (8 May 1934 – 30 August 2015) was a senior British and European civil servant, as well as a member of the House of Lords.

Education and early life
Williamson was educated at Tonbridge School and Exeter College, Oxford. He served in the Royal Signals 1956–58 as his national service. He married Patricia Smith in 1961; they had two sons.

Civil service career

Ministry of Agriculture, Fisheries and Food
He began his civil service career in 1958 at the Ministry of Agriculture, Fisheries and Food, becoming Principal Private Secretary to the minister in 1967.

European Commission
He was Deputy Director-General for Agriculture in the European Commission from 1977 to 1983 and Secretary-General of the European Commission from 1987 to 1997. From 1983 until 1987, Williamson had returned to the United Kingdom to serve as Deputy Secretary and head the European Secretariat in the Cabinet Office.

House of Lords
After leaving Brussels, Williamson was created a life peer on 5 February 1999 with the title Baron Williamson of Horton, of Horton in the County of Somerset, and sat as a crossbencher in the House of Lords. Lord Williamson of Horton was the convenor of the crossbenchers, a task that involves keeping the other non-aligned members up-to-date with the business of the House.

Honours
As well as being appointed a Companion of the Order of the Bath (CB) in 1984 and a Knight Grand Cross of the Order of St Michael and St George (GCMG) in 1998, Williamson was awarded the Knight Commander's Cross of the Bundesverdienstkreuz by Germany, the Commander Grand Cross of the Royal Order of the Polar Star by Sweden and made Commander of the Légion d'honneur by France. He was also sworn of the Privy Council in April 2007.

References

Basic biography from EU press release on retirement in 1997
Additional information from DOD online

External links
Announcement of his introduction at the House of Lords House of Lords Minute of Proceedings, 17 February 1999
Obituary, Politico, 1 September 2015

 

 

1934 births
2015 deaths
Civil servants in the Ministry of Agriculture, Fisheries and Food
Civil servants in the Cabinet Office
Crossbench life peers
Royal Corps of Signals soldiers
Companions of the Order of the Bath
Knights Grand Cross of the Order of St Michael and St George
Members of the Privy Council of the United Kingdom
Knights Commander of the Order of Merit of the Federal Republic of Germany
Commandeurs of the Légion d'honneur
Commanders Grand Cross of the Order of the Polar Star
People educated at Tonbridge School
Alumni of Exeter College, Oxford
Secretaries-General of the European Commission
British officials of the European Union
Life peers created by Elizabeth II